The BB 20100 was a small class of two groups of two dual voltage electric locomotives of SNCF intended for cross-border traffic between France, Switzerland and Germany.

The delivery of locomotives, built in Switzerland, took place in 1958, but they lacked reliability. Providing only modest services over short distances and subject to numerous breakdowns, they were supplanted by more successful classes. Two were withdrawn in 1973, the other two in 1982.

Genesis of locomotives 
At the beginning of the 1950s, following the progressive electrification of the lines of the eastern network of France, and of the northern network of Switzerland, the Swiss Federal Railways wanted to eliminate the use of steam engines for cross-border traffic between Mulhouse and Basel. To do this, it was necessary to design dual-frequency electric locomotives capable of operating under two different power supplies, single-phase AC - in France and single-phase AC - Hz in Switzerland as well as in Germany.

Funding, design and construction were shared through negotiated agreements. Switzerland granted France financial loans for infrastructure works related to electrification and, in return, France ordered the locomotives from the Swiss railway industry. The order was placed in April 1955 with the locomotives being allocated the provisional running numbers –. On delivery of the four locomotives, in 1958, they were finally numbered  .

Description 
The bodies and the mechanical parts were made by SLM-Winterthur and were based on the BB 9200 built by the French manufacturer, MTE. An alternative design, not proceeded with, would have used the same body as BB 9003–9004.

The bogies and motors differed according to the manufacturer of the electrical equipment:
  , whose electrical equipment was supplied by Oerlikon, had four motors using single-phase alternating current at the output of the transformer, similar to the SNCF Class BB 13000, with Jacquemin bogies.
 The equipment of   came from Brown-Boveri; the locomotives had short-wheelbase single-motor bogies using direct current motors, powered by single-phase alternating current rectified by excitrons at the output of the transformer, similar to that of the SNCF Class BB 16500.

In 1961, these four locomotives were renumbered , in the section reserved for AC dual-voltage locomotives, according to SNCF's new numbering system.

Career

Operation 
These locomotives were used on the cross-border link between Mulhouse and Basel from 1958, departing from Strasbourg or Thionville. They also reach Luxembourg, for the haulage of passenger trains and express goods trains. Being prototypes of uncertain reliability, the four  were never simultaneously in service, at least one locomotive was always available to ensure a back-up in the event of a failure. However, the increase in cross-border freight traffic required SNCF to acquire additional dual-voltage locomotives to ensure services between Saint-Louis and Bâle-Muttenz marshalling yards. In consultation with the SBB, this resulted in the order of the Swiss built C 20150s.

From 1966, they were used on the cross-border link between Strasbourg and Kehl, which had just been electrified. To cope with the heavy traffic on the Franco-German axis, the SNCF acquired new dual-frequency machines, the BB 20200 built by Alsthom, a dual-voltage version of the BB 17000. Thirteen locomotives were delivered in 1970. They were much more reliable and powerful than the earlier class. The  were returned to SBB/CFF in 1971 and the  saw their operations restricted to the vicinity of Strasbourg and Mulhouse.  were withdrawn and scrapped in 1973; parts of BB 20104 were recovered to be reused on the remaining members of the class. None of the class have been preserved.

Routes 
 Strasbourg – Bâle-CFF on international services
 Luxembourg – Thionville – Bâle-CFF on international services
 St-Louis marshalling yard – Bâle-Muttenz marshalling yard on freight services
 Strasbourg – Kehl on international services
 Hausbergen marshalling yard – Blainville marshalling yard on freight services

Depot allocation 
From their entry into service to their withdrawal, the locomotives were assigned to Strasbourg.

References

Notes

Bibliography 
 .

 20100
B-B locomotives
 20100
BB 20100
Standard gauge locomotives of France
Passenger locomotives